General elections are due to be held in Singapore no later than 23 November 2025 to elect members of the fifteenth Parliament. The elections will be the nineteenth in Singapore since 1948 and the fourteenth since independence.

Background

According to Article 65 of the Constitution, the maximum term of Parliament is five years from the date of its first sitting following a general election, after which it is dissolved. However, the President can dissolve Parliament at any time during the aforesaid five-year period, if advised by the Prime Minister to do so, and if the President is satisfied that, in tendering that advice, the Prime Minister commands the confidence of a majority of the Members of Parliament (MPs). A general election must be held within three months after every dissolution of Parliament.

Electoral Divisions (also referred to as seats in Parliament) are organised into Single Member Constituencies (SMCs) and Group Representation Constituencies (GRCs). Each SMC returns one MP using the first past the post voting system, while each GRC returns four or five MPs by block voting, at least one of whom must be from the Malay, Indian or other minority communities. A group of candidates intending to contest an election in a GRC must all be members of the same political party, or a group of independent candidates. The voting age in Singapore is 21 years. Elections are conducted by the Elections Department (ELD), a department under the Prime Minister's Office.

The People's Action Party won a majority of seats in the 2020 general election in its toughest contest since independence, winning all but three electoral divisions. It retained West Coast GRC in a fight against the Progress Singapore Party, though with the narrowest margin of victory among all electoral divisions; the top scoring GRC was the neighbouring Jurong GRC won by the party. The Workers' Party won the new Sengkang GRC and retained Aljunied GRC and Hougang SMC. Minister in the Prime Minister's Office Ng Chee Meng, who had led the Sengkang PAP team, was considered the highest profile political casualty of the election.

Only elected MPs within their constituencies are included. NCMPs and Nominated MPs are not included.<noinclude>

Political developments

People's Action Party
The governing People's Action Party (PAP) appointed Heng Swee Keat as First Assistant Secretary-General, and next in line to succeed Lee Hsien Loong as Prime Minister during their Central Executive Committee (CEC) election, subject to the party winning a majority of seats in the next general election. Four new members, including three serving ministers and Ng Chee Meng, were also co-opted into the CEC. Heng subsequently withdrew from and ruled himself out as the potential fourth prime minister in April 2021, citing age and health concerns, though analysts also attributed the withdrawal to Heng's worse-than-expected result in East Coast GRC during the previous general election.

On 14 April 2022, Lawrence Wong was endorsed by an overwhelming majority of PAP MPs as the leader of the fourth generation (4G) of PAP leadership, placing him in line to succeed Lee Hsien Loong as Prime Minister if the party wins a majority of seats in the next general election.

On 13 June 2022, Lawrence Wong was appointed Deputy Prime Minister and Acting Prime Minister in the PM's absence. This move further cemented his standing as the successor to Prime Minister Lee Hsien Loong.

Workers' Party
The Workers' Party (WP) elected the four MPs in Sengkang GRC into the Central Executive Committee, where they were appointed to deputy roles within the party. Party leaders Pritam Singh and Sylvia Lim were re-elected unopposed.

On 30 November 2021, Raeesah Khan resigned from the party and vacated her seat in Parliament after making unsubstantiated allegations in Parliament on three occasions.

Progress Singapore Party
Progress Singapore Party Assistant Secretary-General Leong Mun Wai and Vice-Chairwoman Hazel Poa resigned from their roles to focus on their NCMP duties. A policy research team, youth, and women wings were established as part of the reorganisation of the party.

In April 2021, as part of a leadership renewal, the party elected Francis Yuen as Secretary-General, replacing party founder Tan Cheng Bock who became Chairman. Rumours of a rift within the party that Tan had been pressured by party cadres to step down in order to make way for a younger candidate were denied, with Tan expressing his intention to contest in the next election.

Extraparliamentary parties

Reform Party
Reform Party Secretary-General Kenneth Jeyaretnam removed Chairman Andy Zhu from his position of the CEC and replaced him with Charles Yeo. The party accused Zhu and his associates, for not following proper procedures in the handling of the party's bank account. Zhu went on to form the Singapore United Party with several former members of RP.

Yeo relinquished his position as Chairman of the party on 15 January 2022 due to his arrests over alleged offences of criminal breach of trust and forgery in the course of his work.

References

Singapore
2025